Frari is a surname. Notable people with the surname include:

Angelo Antonio Frari (1780–1865), Dalmatian physician
Michele Carlo Frari (1813–1896), professor of obstetrics
Luigi Frari (1813–1898), physician and political activist